The 1869 Liskeard by-election was fought on 11 May 1869.  The by-election was fought due to the death of the incumbent MP of the Liberal Party, Sir Arthur Buller.  It was won by a Liberal candidate Edward Horsman, who was opposed by a more advanced Liberal, Francis Lycett, due to Horsman's perceived moderation.

References

1869 in England
1869 elections in the United Kingdom
By-elections to the Parliament of the United Kingdom in Cornish constituencies
19th century in Cornwall
May 1869 events
Liskeard